Burhan Nizam Shah I was ruler of the Ahmednagar Sultanate, in Central India. He ascended the throne on the death of his father Ahmad Nizam Shah I in 1508 or 1510 when he was seven years old. He died in 1553 and was succeeded by Hussain Nizam Shah I.

He converted to Shia Islam and royals and commoners followed suit. Sunni theologians and their followers resented this but were crushed. His reign was characterized by religious tolerance, art and flourishing trade. Skirmishes with the Mughals, Bijapur & various other small states continued through his reign. A palace built for Burhan Shah, the second Nizam, stands in ruins two miles south-east of the city of Ahmednagar.

Family
Burhan Nizam Shah had at least two wives. The first, his favourite, was Bibi Amina. The second was Bibi Mariam, the daughter of Yusuf Adil Shah, Sultan of Bijapur. He had six sons:

By Bibi Amina
Hussain Nizam Shah I, Sultan of Ahmednagar;
Abdul Qadir;
By Bibi Mariam
Miran Muhammad Baqir;
Shah Ali, father of Murtaza Nizam Shah II; 
By other women
Shah Haidar, married the daughter of Khwaja Jahan, the ruler of Parinda;
Muhammad Khudabanda;

References

Ahmadnagar Sultanate
1553 deaths
Year of birth unknown
1553 in India